Tidings or The Tidings may refer to:

Books and journals
An-Naba Sūrat an-Nabaʼ (Arabic:, “The Tidings”, “The Announcement”)  seventy-eighth chapter (sura) of the Quran 
The Tidings , former name of newspaper, now Angelus (magazine), of the Los Angeles Roman Catholic Archdiocese
Christadelphian Tidings
Ashland Daily Tidings
West Linn Tidings

Other
Tidings, album by Wolf People
Tidings (Allison Crowe album)

See also
Glad Tidings